Tornado is the fifth studio album by American country music group Little Big Town. It was released on September 11, 2012 via Capitol Nashville. "Pontoon," which was released in April 2012 as the album's lead-off single, has since become their first number one song on the US Billboard Hot Country Songs chart and Little Big Town's fastest-rising single to date. The album's second single, "Tornado," was released on October 1, 2012. It became their first album since 2005's The Road to Here to produce two top 10 singles and to be certified platinum by the Recording Industry Association of America (RIAA).

Commercial performance
"Tornado" debuted at number two on the US Billboard 200, selling 113,000 copies in its first week. The album stayed atop the Billboard Country Albums charts for its first 5 weeks, making it their longest running number one album.  As of December 2013, the album has sold 1,025,000 copies in the United States. It is the band's first album since The Road to Here to receive a certification from the RIAA. It is also their first album of their career to have two certified singles from the RIAA.

Track listing

Personnel

Little Big Town
Karen Fairchild – vocals
Kimberly Schlapman – vocals
Phillip Sweet – vocals, acoustic guitar
Jimi Westbrook – vocals

Musicians
Johnny Duke – electric guitar, acoustic guitar, banjo, mandolin, Dobro, lap steel guitar
Jedd Hughes – electric guitar, acoustic guitar, 12-string guitar, mandolin
Jay Joyce – electric guitar, acoustic guitar, Hammond B-3 organ, programming, synthesizer
Luke Laird – electric guitar
Seth Rausch – drums
Giles Reaves – synthesizer, keyboards, percussion, Wurlitzer electric piano, Hammond B-3 organ
John Thomasson – bass guitar, Moog Taurus bass pedals

Charts

Weekly charts

Year-end charts

Decade-end charts

Certifications

References

2012 albums
Little Big Town albums
Capitol Records albums
Albums produced by Jay Joyce